Sagellula is a genus of east Asian huntsman spiders that was first described by Embrik Strand in 1942. It was originally described under the name "Sagella", but this was changed to Sagellula when a senior homonym was discovered.  it contains two species, found in China and Japan: S. octomunita and S. xizangensis.

See also
 List of Sparassidae species

References

Further reading
 

Araneomorphae genera
Sparassidae
Spiders of Asia
Taxa named by Embrik Strand